Vladimir Ivanovich Lysenko (Russian: Владимир Лысенко; born 1 January 1955) is a Russian academic and world traveler. He set several Guinness World Records related to high-altitude river rafting.

Biography
Lysenko was born in Kharkov, USSR on 1 January 1955 in the family of pilot Ivan Lysenko and engineer-designer Galina Lysenko (Korotkova). He had graduated from the Kharkov Aviation University (aircraft construction faculty) with honors and the postgraduate course of the Siberian Branch of the Russian Academy of Sciences (in the specialty "mechanics of fluid, gas and plasma").

Vladimir has three children: Victor (birthday 27.10.80), after graduating from Novosibirsk State University (Faculty of Economics) who moved from Novosibirsk to Krasnodar; Svetlana (28.10.83), after graduating from the Novosibirsk State University (Faculty of Economics) moved to Moscow, now lives in the Netherlands in Zuid-Scharwoude; and Slaviya (8.10.16).

Education
Lysenko holds a Doctorate of Philosophy (Ph.D.) in fluid mechanics. He is a leading fellow at the Institute of Mechanics of the Russian Academy of Sciences in Novosibirsk.
He authored the book Stability and Transition of High-Speed Boundary Layers and Wakes, as well as over 200 scientific papers.

Traveling

Rafting

In 1996, Lysenko became the first man to raft down the highest peak of every continent (except the Antarctic), as well as the highest peak of Oceania.

In September 1996, he set the Guinness World Record for high-altitude rafting with a  start on the Eastern Rong Chu River on Mount Everest; the previous record of  had been set in September 1976 by the Mike-Jones team of England.

Vladimir rafted also on mountain sources of Amazon River and the Nile, kayaked on Yukon River. He rafted in 100 countries (including Nepal, China, Pakistan, India, Afghanistan, etc.).

Circumnavigation in a car
Between September 1997 and 2002, Lysenko crossed 62 countries by car. He crossed each continent (other than Antarctica) twice, traveling between the most distant points of each continent in both latitude and longitude. He crossed the Americas from Prudhoe Bay, Alaska to Tierra del Fuego in Argentina; from Punta Pariñas, Peru to Cape Cabo Branko, Brazil; and from Anchor Bay, Alaska to St. John's, Newfoundland and Labrador, Canada. His routes across Africa took him from Cape Agulhas, South Africa to Ras-Angela Cape, Tunisia; and from Somali to Dakar. Crossing Europe and Asia, he travelled from Cabo da Roca, Portugal to Galimiy and Magadan in Russia; and from Tanjung Piai in Peninsular Malaysia to North Cape, Norway. Australia was crossed from Cape Byron to Steep Point and from Cape York Peninsula to South Point. These travels totaled .

Circumnavigation on a bicycle
The start was in Vladivostok, Russia in 2006. Lysenko has ridden  on a bicycle. He has cycled via 29 countries - Russia, Mongolia, Kazakhstan, Ukraine, Slovakia, Austria, Germany, Liechtenstein, Switzerland, Italy, France, Spain, Morocco (and Western Sahara), São Tomé and Príncipe, Argentina, Chile, Peru, Ecuador, El Salvador, Guatemala, Belize, Mexico, the United States, Kiribati, Nauru, New Zealand, Australia, Indonesia, North Korea.

The path of Gold Rush
In 2003, Lysenko duplicated the path of the Klondike Gold Rush of 1897–1898, travelling by foot and kayak.

Circumnavigation along the equator
Lysenko had circumnavigated the globe from west to east, straying no more than two degrees of latitude from the Equator. Starting in Libreville (Gabon), Vladimir had successfully crossed (in a car, a motor boat, a yacht, a ship, a kayak, a bicycle, and by foot) Africa (from Libreville (Gabon) to Kiunga (Kenya) through Gabon, Republic of Congo, Democratic Republic of the Congo, Uganda and Kenya), Indian Ocean, Indonesia (from Padang to Biak), Pacific Ocean, South America (from Pedernales (Ecuador) to Macapa (Brazil) through Ecuador, Colombia and Brazil) and Atlantic Ocean with finish in Libreville in 2012.

Project "From Earth's Bowels to Stratosphere"
Then he had traveled in a car from Carletonville to Moscow, passing through South Africa, Namibia, Angola, the Congo, Zaire, Kenya, Ethiopia, Sudan, Egypt, Jordan, Syria, Lebanon, Turkey, Azerbaijan, and Russia. And then Lysenko made a series of lifting by various planes to the stratosphere (to the height of 11–16,5 km). Difference of altitudes on this route (from the mine bottom to the stratosphere) was 3.5 + 16.5 = , and difference of temperatures 58°+ |-56°| = 114°С.

Vladimir had visited all 195 countries (UN members and observers).

Affiliations
Lysenko is the President of Union of Russian Around-the-World Travelers, and the Chairman of Himalayan Club of Russian Rafters & Kayakers.

Bibliography
 Vladimir Lysenko. Rafting Down the Highest World Peaks  1997. Novosibirsk
 Vladimir Lysenko. Round-the-World Tour In a Car  2002. Novosibirsk
 V.I.Lysenko. Stability and Transition of High-Speed Boundary Layers and Wakes.  2006. Novosibirsk
 Vladimir Lysenko. Round-the-World Tour On a Bicycle  2014. Novosibirsk
 Vladimir Lysenko.Round-the-World Tour Along the Equator  2014. Novosibirsk
 Vladimir Lysenko. From the Earth Bowels to the Stratosphere  2014. Novosibirsk
 Vladimir Lysenko's travellings.  2016. Volgograd
 Vladimir Lysenko. Photosketches of 100 most interesting and various countries.  2017. Novosibirsk 
 Modern Russian Travellers, Vol.2: Vladimir Lysenko, My travellings and adventures (in Russian). 2018. Novosibirsk

References

External links

 Union of Russian Around-the-World Travellers site 
 Himalayan Club of Russian Rafters & Kayakers site  
 Down-the-Highest-World-Peaks Rafters & Kayakers Clubs 
Рафтинг в Гималаях (Rafting in Himalayas)  by Vladimir Lysenko
Lib.Ru: Владимир Лысенко  Books by Vladimir Lysenko
ПО МАРШРУТУ "ЗОЛОТОЙ ЛИХОРАДКИ" (Route "Gold Rush") Труд (165), 2003-09-06. 
ЛОЦИЯ реки КОКСУ из ОТЧЕТа (Pilot River Cox's Report) 
ГОСТЕПРИИМСТВО ЛЮДОЕДОВ (Hospitality Ogre) 

Travelers
Circumnavigators of the globe
1955 births
Living people
Engineers from Kharkiv